Megalagrion oceanicum is a species of damselfly in the family Coenagrionidae that is endemic to the island of Oahu in Hawaii. It inhabits rivers in the Waianae and Koolau ranges. It is threatened by habitat loss.

References

Coenagrionidae
Insects of Hawaii
Endemic fauna of Hawaii
Insects described in 1883
Taxonomy articles created by Polbot
ESA endangered species